Chal Bardar (also Romanized as Chāl Bardar) is a village in Jastun Shah Rural District, Hati District, Lali County, Khuzestan Province, Iran. At the 2006 census, its population was 81, in 18 families.

References 

Populated places in Lali County